Fatmata Fofanah (born 10 June 1985 in Freetown, Sierra Leone) is a Guinean athlete who specializes in the 100 metres hurdles. Born in Sierra Leone during the Civil War, she grew up in Guinea and the United States.  Fatmata was twice an All-American Women's Track and Field athlete for the Georgia Tech Yellow Jackets, and in early 2008, won the 100 Metre Hurdles Gold Medal at the African Championships in Addis Ababa, Ethiopia.

She was chosen for the 2008 Guinean Olympic squad to run the Women's 100 m hurdles, was the Flag Bearer for her nation, and was much favoured going into her first qualifying heat.  She fell at the first hurdle, and while uninjured, was unable to finish.

Her brother, Nabie Foday Fofanah is a sprinter who has also competed in the 2004 and 2008 Guinean Olympic squads.

Her personal best time is 12.96 seconds, achieved in June 2007 in Sacramento.

Achievements

References

External links
 

1985 births
Living people
Guinean female hurdlers
Bahraini female hurdlers
Olympic athletes of Guinea
Athletes (track and field) at the 2008 Summer Olympics
Georgia Tech Yellow Jackets women's track and field athletes
Athletes (track and field) at the 2010 Asian Games
Sportspeople from Freetown
Asian Games competitors for Bahrain
African Games bronze medalists for Guinea
African Games medalists in athletics (track and field)
Athletes (track and field) at the 2007 All-Africa Games